Baby Face Finlayson is a fictional character in a comic strip in the UK comic The Beano, first appearing in issue 1553, dated 22 April 1972. Baby Face Finlayson "The Cutest Bandit in the West" is an outlaw from the American Old West, and is, in fact, a baby.

His name is derived from the real-life American gangster of the 1930s Baby Face Nelson (real name Lester Joseph Gillis).

He was originally a minor character in Little Plum, but was later given a spin-off strip of his own. He rode around in a motorised pram, stealing everything that wasn't tied down, whilst shouting "Yuk Yuk!". He had a number of accomplices, including Jessie James, Sid the Kid and Goo Goo McGoo who were also, apparently, babies. Their chief nemesis was Sheriff "Marsh" Mallow of Cactus Gulch.

When the strip returned in 1980, the Wild West theme was dropped, and the setting was moved to England. The tagline was also changed to "The Cutest Bandit Around". However, in the final strip of the second series, he was posted back to America by the angry Beano editor, whom Baby-Face had tried to kidnap. On both occasions, the strip was drawn by Ron Spencer.

In issue 3181, dated 5 July 2003, he cameoed in a Little Plum strip, when he stole Little Plum's wigwam. He sped off in his pram, crashed into a buffalo so Little Plum thought he had learned his lesson, until he steals Little Plum's clothes without him noticing and rides off. In September 2004 he reappeared again for five weeks in his own strip, this time drawn by Emilios Hatjoullis. He has appeared in the Beano Annual every year since then. In 2006 Baby Face returned as a villainous gangster in the Bash Street Kids adventures "School's Out" and "Hot Rod Cow", written and drawn by Kev F Sutherland. He appears in the 2008 Beano annual in the story "Pluggy Love", where Danny believes that Plug's girlfriend is evil as he thinks Baby-Face is her father. It turns out she's his babysitter and her father was pushing his pram. He appeared once again in the 2009 annual in "Reservoir Dodge", where after discovering a Weather-Predicting device Roger and Walter sold him is fake, he tries to kill them and invites a group of other fictional villains over, like the Joker, a Dalek, a devil, and Bully Beef. Other Beano characters try to help Roger, but are also placed above the piranha fish tank. However Alexander the Lemming and Winston the Cat push the tank over, forcing the villains away.

Baby-Face Finlayson returned to The Beano in the Funsize Funnies in #3660 drawn by Alexander Matthews.

References

1972 comics debuts
Beano strips
British comics characters
Child characters in comics
Comics characters introduced in 1972
Comics spin-offs
Western (genre) comics characters
Western (genre) outlaws
Humor comics
Male characters in comics